Vera Fedorovna Matyukh (1910-2003) was a Russian artist of German origin. 

She was born in Berlin and lived there until the age of 13. She then moved to Russia and studied art in Kharkiv in the late 1920s with Vasili Ermilov. She lived and worked in Leningrad in the 1930s. She was influenced by Russian avant-garde movements such as Constructivism and artists such as Mikhail Matyushin, Pavel Filonov, Kazimir Malevich and her mentor Pavel Kondratiev. She also studied with Lev Yudin, Konstantin Rozhdestvensky, Georgi Vereisky and Nikolai Tyrsa. 

After the war, she was a member of the Leningrad Experimental Graphics Workshop along with Aleksandr Vedernikov, Boris Ermolaev, and Anatoli Kaplan. She was known as a master of coloured lithography. In 1961, Eric Estorick brought the works of the LEGL school to the world's attention through famous exhibitions in London and New York. 

Her works are held in museum collections including the State Russian Museum, State Tretyakov Gallery, St. Petersburg History Museum, Museum of St. Petersburg Art of the 20-21st Centuries, Anna Akhmatova Museum in the Fountain House, Tsarskoselskaya Kolleksiya Museum, Museum of Modern Art in New York, the Derfner Judaica Museum, The Art Museum at Hebrew Home at Riverdale, NY, etc. 

The St. Petersburg art historian, Nikolai Kononikhin, has written a book on her life and times, titled Faith: The Life and Creativity of Vera Matyukh, with the support of the Frants Art Foundation.

References

Russian artists
1910 births
2003 deaths